Ryōgoku Kajinosuke II (両國 勇治郎, March 18, 1892 – August 10, 1960) was a Japanese sumo wrestler. His highest rank was sekiwake.

Career
He made a debut in June 1909. He reached the top makuuchi division in May 1914 and won the championship with a 9-0-1 record. He is the only wrestler since 1909 to win the top division championship at his first attempt. After the win, he changed his shikona from Ryōgoku Yūjirō to Ryōgoku Kajinosuke. He reached sekiwake rank in January 1915 but was unable to climb any higher and spent most of the rest of his career as a maegashira. He retired in January 1924. After retirement, he worked under the name Takekuma in the Dewanoumi ichimon, and recruited Musashiyama. However, he later left the Dewanoumi ichimon and established Takekuma stable.

Top division record

See also
Glossary of sumo terms
List of past sumo wrestlers
List of sumo tournament top division champions

References

External links
Tournament results

1892 births
1960 deaths
People from Daisen, Akita
Japanese sumo wrestlers
Sumo people from Akita Prefecture
Sekiwake